Ivan Zemljak (Zagreb, 1893 - Zagreb, 1963) was a Croatian modernist architect, best known for his designs for schools.

Life 
Zemljak studied at the Graz University of Technology from 1912 to 1914, later attending the German Technical College in Prague. Following his 1920 graduation, Zemljak worked in Zagreb, Yugoslavia, where he completed a number of projects.

In 1929, Zemljak visited the Germany and the Netherlands where he came into contact with neoplasticism and the work of Jacobus Oud.

Zemljak's style was characterized by the fusion of elements of the international style with features of traditional Croatian architecture.

Works 

 1924 House, Nike Grškovića 11, Zagreb
 1928 Apartment building, Masarykova 13, Zagreb
 1930 Jordanov School, Jordanovac 113, Zagreb
 1930 Selska Road school, Selska cesta 19, Zagreb
 1933 Jakićevo Road school, Zagreb
 1935 Koturaška Road school, Koturaška ulica, Zagreb
 1935 Observatory in Jordanovac, Zagreb
 1937 Craft school, Savska 39, Zagreb
 1940 School and pediatrician in Knežija, Zadarska 31, Zagreb

Gallery

References 

Architects from Zagreb
Yugoslav architects
1893 births
1963 deaths